Donky von Alpha 6*4 is a German television series.

See also
List of German television series

1995 German television series debuts
1995 German television series endings
German animated television series
German-language television shows
Das Erste original programming